Tanishk-Vayu is a duo of Indian composer Tanishk Bagchi and lyricist Vayu Shrivastav, who also act as a composer duo. They together composed for films like Tanu Weds Manu Returns (2015), Bareilly Ki Barfi (2017), Tumhari Sulu (2017), Shubh Mangal Saavdhan (2017), Munna Michael (2017), Gold (2018), Mitron (2018), Dil Juunglee (2018), Badhaai Ho( 2018),  Shubh Mangal Zyada Saavdhan (2020), etc. The duo also composed the Pepsi Anthem of 2020 named Swag Se Solo.

Discography

References

Indian film score composers
Indian lyricists
Indian male songwriters
Indian male film score composers